Joe Cephus Taylor (March 2, 1926 – March 18, 1993) was an American baseball player whose 18-year semi-pro and professional career included 119 games over parts of four seasons in Major League Baseball.

Baseball career
Taylor was a hard-hitting outfielder whose career began in the semipro ranks in 1946. From 1949 to 1951, he played in the Negro leagues, including service with the Chicago American Giants, prior to entering minor league baseball (MiLB) at the Class C level. By , he was an All-Star in the Triple-A International League, hitting .323 with 23 home runs for the Ottawa A's.

The performance earned him a call-up to the American League and the Philadelphia Athletics in August, but Taylor hit only .224 with 13 hits in 18 games during the franchise's waning days in its original home city. He did not make the move to Kansas City with the Athletics, spending 1955 with three clubs at the top levels of the minors. Two strong campaigns and an All-Star selection as a member of the Seattle Rainiers of the Open-Classification Pacific Coast League got him a late-season trial with the  Cincinnati Redlegs. Taylor batted .262 with 28 hits (including four home runs) in 33 games over the final two months of the season, including 24 starts as a corner outfielder. At season's end, however, he was included in a five-player December 5 trade in which the Redlegs, seeking pitching help, acquired three hurlers from the St. Louis Cardinals.

Taylor began  at Triple-A Omaha before his recall to St. Louis late in May. Playing sparingly, he batted .304 in 23 at bats, largely as a pinch hitter, before he was claimed on waivers by the Baltimore Orioles on July 25. He played in 50 games for Baltimore over two seasons, but batted a composite .239. His last major-league appearance came July 21, 1959, as a pinch hitter against his first-ever MLB team, the Athletics. He then returned to the Triple-A Vancouver Mounties, where he was selected to the Pacific Coast League All-Star team for a second time. He played in the high minors in the United States and Mexico through 1963 before retiring.

Taylor's baseball career was hampered by bouts of alcoholism. In parts of four years with four MLB teams, Taylor batted .249 in 119 games. His 74 career hits included 16 doubles, one triple and nine homers, with 31 runs batted in. In addition, he played for the Leones del Caracas of the Venezuelan Professional Baseball League (VPBL).

References

External links

Kuzmiak, Steve, Joe Taylor. Society for American Baseball Research Biography Project

1926 births
1993 deaths
African-American baseball players
Baltimore Orioles players
Baseball players from Alabama
Chicago American Giants players
Cincinnati Redlegs players
Columbus Jets players
Farnham Pirates players
Hawaii Islanders players
Leones del Caracas players
American expatriate baseball players in Venezuela
Major League Baseball outfielders
Omaha Cardinals players
Ottawa A's players
Pericos de Puebla players
Philadelphia Athletics players
Portland Beavers players
St. Hyacinthe A's players
St. Louis Cardinals players
San Diego Padres (minor league) players
Seattle Rainiers players
Baseball players from Pittsburgh
Tigres del México players
Toronto Maple Leafs (International League) players
Vancouver Mounties players
Williamsport A's players
Winnipeg Buffaloes players
American expatriate baseball players in Mexico
American expatriate baseball players in Canada
20th-century African-American sportspeople